The Austrian records in swimming are the fastest ever performances of swimmers from Austria, which are recognised and ratified by Austria's national swimming federation: Österreichischer Schwimmverband (OSV).

All records were set in finals unless noted otherwise.

Long Course (50 m)

Men

Women

Mixed relay

Short Course (25 m)

Men

Women

Mixed relay

References
General
Austrian records 18 December 2022 updated
Specific

External links
 OSV web site

Austria
Records
Swimming
Swimming